Tolagnaro Airport (also known as Marillac Airport) is an airport in Fort-Dauphin (Madagascar), Anosy Region, Madagascar .

Airlines and destinations

International flights have ceased in the 2020-2021 COVID crisis. There are only Tsaradia flights to Antananarivo.

References

Airports in Madagascar
Anosy